This is an incomplete list of notable Jewish American philosophers. For other Jewish Americans, see Lists of Jewish Americans. For a list of Jewish philosophers, see .

 Max Black, analytic philosopher
Harry Jaffa, political philosopher
Allan Bloom
Joseph Cropsey
 Joseph Blau, philosopher
 Paul Edwards
 Richard Popkin, philosopher
 Judith Butler,
 Stanley Cavell's (d. 2018)
 Noam Chomsky   
 Arthur Danto (d. 2013)
 Hubert Dreyfus (d. 2017) 
 Paul Gottfried
 Michael Walzer
 Thomas Nagel
 Hilary Putnam
 Saul Kripke
 Judea Pearl
 Douglas Hofstadter
 Jerry Fodor
 George Boolos

See also
 List of American philosophers
 List of African American philosophers

Footnotes

Philosophers
Jewish
Jewish American
American